Anion-conducting channelrhodopsins are light-gated ion channels that open in response to light and let negatively charged ions (such as chloride) enter a cell. All channelrhodopsins use retinal as light-sensitive pigment, but they differ in their ion selectivity. Anion-conducting channelrhodopsins are used as tools to manipulate brain activity in mice, fruit flies and other model organisms (Optogenetics). Neurons expressing anion-conducting channelrhodopsins are silenced when illuminated with light, an effect that has been used to investigate information processing in the brain. For example, suppressing dendritic calcium spikes in specific neurons with light reduced the ability of mice to perceive a light touch to a whisker. Studying how the behavior of an animal changes when specific neurons are silenced allows scientists to determine the role of these neurons in the complex circuits controlling behavior.

The first anion-conducting channelrhodopsins were engineered from the cation-conducting light-gated channel Channelrhodopsin-2 by removing negatively charged amino acids from the channel pore (Fig. 1). As the main anion of extracellular fluid is chloride (Cl−), anion-conducting channelrhodopsins are also known as “chloride-conducting channelrhodopsins” (ChloCs). Naturally occurring anion-conducting channelrhodopsins  (ACRs) were subsequently identified in cryptophyte algae. The crystal structure of the natural GtACR1 has recently been solved, paving the way for further protein engineering.

Variants

Applications 
Anion-conducting channelrhodopsins (ACRs) have been used as optogenetic tools to inhibit neuronal activation. When expressed in nerve cells, ACRs act as light-gated chloride channels. Their effect on the activity of the neuron is comparable to GABAA receptors, ligand-gated chloride channels found in inhibitory synapses: As the chloride concentration in mature neurons is very low, illumination results in an inward flux of negatively charged ions, clamping the neuron at the chloride reversal potential (- 65 mV). Under these conditions, excitatory synaptic inputs are not able to efficiently depolarize the neuron. This effect is known as shunting inhibition (as opposed to inhibition by hyperpolarization). Illuminating the dendrite prevents the generation of dendritic calcium spikes while illumination of the entire neuron blocks action potential initiation in response to sensory stimulation. Axon terminals, however, have a higher chloride concentration and are therefore excited by ACRs. To inhibit neurons with wide-field illumination, it has proven useful to restrict ACRs to the somatic compartment (ST variants).

Due to their high light sensitivity, ACRs can be activated with dim light which does not interfere with visual stimulation, even in very small animals like the fruit fly Drosophila. When combined with a red-light sensitive cation-conducting channelrhodopsin, ACRs allow for bidirectional control of neurons: Silencing with blue light, activation with red light ('Bipoles').

Further reading 
Neuron Review (2017): Silencing neurons: Tools, Applications, and Experimental Constraints

Research highlight: A better way to turn off neurons

Perspective: Expanding the optogenetics toolkit

Related: Halorhodopsin, a light-driven chloride pump

References 

Ion channels